Fangio was a Belgian professional cycling team that existed from 1975 to 1979. The team competed in the 1986 Vuelta a España, but did not have any wins. It was succeeded by the  team.

Final roster

Major wins

1980
 Overall Tour of Ireland, Dave Cuming
1981
 Omloop Schelde-Durme, Rudy Matthijs
1982
 Omloop van het Zuidwesten, Alain Van Hoornweder
 De Kustpijl, Kurt Dockx
1983
 Le Samyn, Jacques van Meer
 Omloop van het Waasland, Alain Van Hoornweder
 Tour Européen Lorraine-Alsace
Stage 1a, Michel Dernies
Stage 2, Léo Wellens
 Stage 8b Tour de l'Avenir, Léo Wellens
1984
 Grand Prix de Denain, Yves Godimus
 Dwars door West-Vlaanderen, William Tackaert
 Stage 1 Tour de Luxembourg, William Tackaert
1985
 Kuurne–Brussels–Kuurne, William Tackaert
 Omloop van het Waasland, William Tackaert
 Stage 1 Danmark Rundt, Eric Van Lancker
 Stage 3 Tour de Luxembourg, Philippe Van Vooren
 Stage 4 Herald Sun Tour, William Tackaert
 Stage 1a Three Days of De Panne, William Tackaert
1986
 Nokere Koerse, Luc Colijn
 De Kustpijl, Patrick Versluys
 Stage 5b Four Days of Dunkirk, Rigobert Matt
 Stage 2 Danmark Rundt, Eddy Vanhaerens

References

Cycling teams based in Belgium
Defunct cycling teams based in Belgium
1979 establishments in Belgium
1986 disestablishments in Belgium
Cycling teams established in 1979
Cycling teams disestablished in 1986